Kinbuchi-ike Dam  is an earthfill dam located in Kagawa Prefecture in Japan. The dam is used for irrigation. The dam impounds about 26  ha of land when full and can store 1793 thousand cubic meters of water. The construction of the dam was completed in 1933.

See also
List of dams in Japan

References

Dams in Kagawa Prefecture